Bruce A. Manning is a Professor of Chemistry and Biochemistry at San Francisco State University. He is an internationally recognized expert in environmental chemistry.

Life 
He earned a B.S. in environmental science at the University of Massachusetts Amherst in 1985 and a Ph.D. in environmental chemistry from the University of California, Davis in 1993. Prior to joining SFSU he was a Postdocoral Scientist at the USDA U.S. Salinity Laboratory in Riverside CA and the University of California, Riverside. Professor Manning has been a pioneer in applying X-ray techniques such as X-ray diffraction, fluorescence, and absorption spectroscopy to environmental chemistry problems and materials chemical research.  Professor Manning's research interests include soil chemistry, surface analysis, mineralogy, remediation, inorganic chemical analysis, and computational chemistry.  His research has been funded by NSF, USDA, and DuPont and was a Research Corporation Cottrell College Science Award Fellow from 2001-2005.

External links
 Bruce Manning CV
 SFSU Department of Chemistry and Biochemistry
 San Francisco State University
 USDA U.S. Salinity Laboratory

San Francisco State University faculty
University of Massachusetts Amherst College of Natural Sciences alumni
University of California, Davis alumni
Year of birth missing (living people)
Living people